Valdosta 1989 is a complete concert by Athens, Georgia's Widespread Panic on CD.  The 2 disc set is the second release from the Widespread Panic archives.  The performance was recorded live at The Armory in Valdosta, Georgia on April 8, 1989.  The live to two track recordings feature all original band members including late guitarist Michael Houser.

Track listing

Disc 1
 "Porch Song" (Widespread Panic) – :44
 "Space Wrangler" (Widespread Panic) – 7:51
 "Travelin' Light" (J.J. Cale) – 4:47
 "Heaven" (David Byrne / Jerry Harrison) – 5:39
 "Machine" (Widespread Panic) – 3:45
 "Conrad" (Widespread Panic) – 7:41
 "Holden Oversoul" (Widespread Panic) – 3:49
 "Stop-Go" (Widespread Panic) – 6:53
 "Cream Puff War" (Jerry Garcia/Hunter) – 4:08
 "Pigeons" (Widespread Panic) – 5:57
 "C. Brown" (Widespread Panic) – 6:53
 "Coconut" (Widespread Panic) – 7:00

Disc 2
 "Jam" (Widespread Panic) – 2:28
 "LA" (Widespread Panic) – 3:48
 "A of D" (Widespread Panic) – 3:06
 "B of D" (Widespread Panic) – 5:04
 "Impossible" (Widespread Panic) – 5:52
 "I'm Not Alone" (Widespread Panic) – 4:28
 "Barstools and Dreamers" (Widespread Panic) – 10:34
 "Driving Song" (Widespread Panic) – 4:20
 "Disco" (Widespread Panic) – 5:52
 "Driving Song" (Widespread Panic) – 7:28
 "The Last Straw" (Widespread Panic) – 5:42
 "Jack" (Widespread Panic) – 6:38
 "Chilly Water" (Widespread Panic) – 9:54
 "Can't Find My Way Home" (Steve Winwood) – 4:33

Personnel

Widespread Panic
 John "JB" Bell – Vocals, Guitar
 Michael Houser – Guitar, Vocals
 Dave Schools – Bass
 Todd Nance – Drums
 Domingo S. Ortiz – Percussion

Production
 Mixed by John Keane/Keane Recording, Ltd, Athens, GA.
 Live 2 Track Mix by Doug Oade
 Live Recording by Bill "Gomer" Jordan and Doug Oade
 Packaging by Chris Bilheimer

References

External links
 Widespread Panic website
 Widespread Panic Archives Blog

Widespread Panic live albums
2009 live albums